It was a Dacian fortified town.

References

Dacian fortresses in Buzău County
Historic monuments in Buzău County
History of Muntenia